Daniel Joseph Mahoney (September 6, 1888 – September 28, 1960) was a Major League Baseball player who played for the Cincinnati Reds during the 1911 season. His only major league appearance came when he pinch ran in the 7th inning of a game played in Philadelphia on May 15, 1911.

References

External links

1888 births
1960 deaths
Cincinnati Reds players
Baseball players from Massachusetts
Sportspeople from Haverhill, Massachusetts
Terre Haute Miners players
Terre Haute Terre-iers players
South Bend Benders players
Bradford Drillers players